Lucilla Andreucci (born December 19, 1969 in Rome) is a former long-distance runner from Italy.

Biography
She set her personal best (2:29:43) in the women's marathon on December 3, 2000 in Milan, Italy. She has 16 caps in national team from 1997 to 2007. She is the twin sister of Florinda Andreucci, she also a long-distance runner.

Achievements

National titles
She won five national championships at individual senior level.
Italian Athletics Championships
5000 m: 1997
10,000 m: 1998
Half marathon: 1996, 1997, 1998

References

External links
 
Lucilla Andreucci at Marathoninfo

1969 births
Living people
Italian female long-distance runners
Italian female marathon runners
Athletes from Rome
Athletics competitors of Gruppo Sportivo Forestale
Universiade medalists in athletics (track and field)
World Athletics Championships athletes for Italy
Universiade silver medalists for Italy
Medalists at the 1997 Summer Universiade
20th-century Italian women
21st-century Italian women